Olivier Paul Jules, Baron Vanneste (18 May 1930 – 18 September 2014) was a Belgian politician and economist. A member of the CD&V (formerly known as the Christian People's Party, CVP, until 2001), Vanneste served as the Governor of West Flanders from 1979 until 1997.

Vanneste, an economist, was born in Kortrijk, Belgium. In 1954, he published his book, Structurele Werkloosheid in West-Vlaanderen, which was later utilized an outline for economic development in West Flanders. Vanneste served as the founder and managing director of both the West-Vlaamse Economische Raad and the West-Vlaams Economisch Studiebureau. 

He served as the Governor of West Flanders from 1979 to 1997. 

Vanneste stepped down as governor in 1997. Following his retirement from public office, he served as a director of several business and organizations, including KBC Bank, the Port of Bruges-Zeebrugge, and the Katholieke Universiteit Leuven (KU Leuven). In 2001, Vanneste was raised into the Belgian nobility by King Albert II and given the noble title Baron for life.

Olivier Vanneste died on 18 September 2014 in Bruges at the age of 84.

References

1930 births
2014 deaths
Governors of West Flanders
Barons of Belgium
Belgian economists
Academic staff of KU Leuven
Christian Democratic and Flemish politicians
People from Kortrijk
People from West Flanders